John Philip Taylor (7 April 1904 – 20 October 1980) was a British freestyle swimmer who competed in the 1924 Summer Olympics. He was born in Ormskirk, Lancashire. In 1924 he was eliminated in the semi-finals of the 1500 metre freestyle event.

References

External links
profile

1904 births
1980 deaths
English male swimmers
Olympic swimmers of Great Britain
Swimmers at the 1924 Summer Olympics
People from Ormskirk
English male freestyle swimmers